This timeline documents all of the events of the 2015 Pacific typhoon season. Most of the tropical cyclones formed between May and November. The scope of this article is limited to the Pacific Ocean, north of the equator between 100°E and the International Date Line. This area, called the Western Pacific basin, is the responsibility of the Japanese Meteorological Agency (JMA). They host and operate the Regional Specialized Meteorological Center (RSMC), located in Tokyo. The Japanese Meteorological Agency (JMA) is also responsible for assigning names to all tropical storms that are formed within the basin. However, any storm that enters or forms in the Philippine Area of Responsibility (PAR) will be named (or renamed) by the Philippine Atmospheric, Geophysical and Astronomical Services Administration (PAGASA) using a local name. Also of note -  the Western Pacific basin is monitored by the United States' Joint Typhoon Warning Center (JTWC), which gives all Tropical depressions a number with a "W" suffix.

During the season, a total of 36 systems were designated as Tropical Depressions, as determined by the following Meteorological organizations: the Japan Meteorological Agency (JMA); the Philippine Atmospheric, Geophysical and Astronomical Services Administration (PAGASA); the Joint Typhoon Warning Center (JTWC); or one of various other reporting agencies, such as the China Meteorological Administration, or the Hong Kong Observatory. Throughout the 2015 season, 13 systems entered or formed in the Philippine Area of Responsibility (PAR), with six of them making landfall directly over the Philippines.

The first five months of the season were unusually active and intense due to a developing El Niño. Mekkhala became an early-forming storm of the season and affected the Philippines. Typhoon Higos formed a month after Mekkhala, reaching its peak intensity as a Category 4 typhoon. Higos broke the record as the most intense storm and the easternmost forming storm within the basin during the month of February until Typhoon Wutip in 2019. During the end of next month, Typhoon Maysak reached its peak intensity as a Category 5 super typhoon with a minimum pressure of 910 millibars, which became the strongest typhoon before the month of April, however Noul became the strongest in terms of windspeeds two months after. In additional, when Dolphin was named on May 9, it became the earliest seventh named storm to form within the basin since 1971. So far this year, ten typhoons underwent rapid deepening.

Timeline

January
January 2
06:00 UTC — The JMA reports that a tropical depression has developed to the northwest of Brunei, within an area that was marginally favourable for further development.

January 4
06:00 UTC — The tropical depression previously located to the northwest of Brunei is last noted by the JMA, as it dissipates in the South China Sea near the border of Malaysia and Indonesia.

January 13
15:00 UTC - The JTWC (Joint Typhoon Warning Center) monitors a tropical depression was designated as Tropical Depression 01W.

January 14
06:00 UTC — 01W intensified into a tropical storm by the JMA (Japan Meteorological Agency), naming it Mekkhala.
21:00 UTC — Mekkhala entered the Philippine area of Responsibility (PAR), as it was named as Amang by the PAGASA.

January 15
03:00 UTC — The JTWC upgrades Mekkhala to a tropical storm.

January 16
12:00 UTC — According to the JMA, Mekkhala intensified into a severe tropical storm.

January 17
00:00 UTC — The JMA upgraded Mekkhala to a minimal typhoon and reached its peak intensity with 10-minute maximum sustained winds of 110 km/h (70 mph).
03:00 UTC — The JTWC in the other hand, classified Mekkhala's peak as a Category 1 typhoon with winds of 130 km/h (80 mph).
07:00 UTC — PAGASA had reported that Mekkhala (Amang) had made landfall over Dolores, Eastern Samar of the Philippines.
09:00 UTC — Both the JMA and the JTWC downgraded the system to a tropical storm.

January 18
15:00 UTC — The JTWC downgraded Mekkhala to a tropical depression.
18:00 UTC — Mekkhala had fully weakened into a tropical depression.

January 21
00:00 UTC — The JMA stopped warning on the system as it was absorbed by a stationary front over eastern Luzon.

February
February 7
06:00 UTC — The JTWC monitors a tropical depression was designated as Tropical Depression 02W.
15:00 UTC — The JTWC designates 02W to tropical Storm, as it started to intensify.
18:00 UTC — 02W intensified into a tropical storm by the JMA, naming it Higos whilst the JTWC also upgraded Higos to a tropical storm.

February 8
18:00 UTC — The JMA upgrades Higos to a severe tropical storm whilst the JTWC upgraded Higos to a Category 1 typhoon.

February 9
12:00 UTC — The JMA upgrades Higos to a typhoon whilst the JTWC upgraded Higos to a Category 2 typhoon.

February 10
03:00 UTC — Higos starts to undergo rapid deepening as its eye became more clearer.
06:00 UTC — The JTWC classified Higos's peak as a Category 4 typhoon with winds of 215 km/h (130 mph).
12:00 UTC — The JTWC reports that Typhoon Higos has weakened and become equivalent to a Category 3 typhoon on the SSHWS.
18:00 UTC — The JTWC reports that Typhoon Higos has weakened and become equivalent to a Category 2 typhoon on the SSHWS.
21:00 UTC — The JMA reports that Typhoon Higos has weakened into a severe tropical storm.

February 11
00:00 UTC — The JMA reports that Severe Tropical Storm Higos has weakened into a tropical storm.
00:00 UTC — The JTWC reports that Typhoon Higos has weakened and become equivalent to a Category 1 typhoon on the SSHWS.
12:00 UTC — The JTWC downgraded Higos to a tropical depression.
18:00 UTC — Higos had fully weakened into a tropical depression.

February 13
06:00 UTC — The JMA stopped warning on the system as it was absorbed by a stationary front over eastern Mariana Islands.

March
March 10

March 11
03:00 UTC — The tropical depression forms and was designated as 03W by the JTWC.
06:00 UTC — The JMA reports that the tropical depression has developed into a tropical storm.

March 14
12:00 UTC — According to both agencies, Bavi had reached its peak strength as a strong tropical storm.

March 17
18:00 UTC — The PAGASA had reported that Bavi had entered their area, giving the name Betty.
21:00 UTC — All three agencies downgrade Bavi to a tropical depression, as moderate to high vertical wind shear caused Bavi's circulation to become exposed.

March 23
00:00 UTC — Tropical Depression Bavi (Betty) had fully dissipated west of Manila.

March 27
03:00 UTC — The JTWC starts designating a tropical depression to 04W.
15:00 UTC — As of the JTWC, 04W intensified into a tropical storm.
18:00 UTC — The JMA followed suit of upgrading it. With this, it was named Maysak.

March 28
12:00 UTC — Maysak starts to show signs of a developing eye, as it was upgraded to a severe tropical storm by the JMA.
18:00 UTC — The JMA upgrades Maysak to a typhoon, even though the JTWC still classifies it as a tropical storm.
21:00 UTC — Finally, the JTWC upgrades Maysak to a Category 1 typhoon.

March 29
18:00 UTC — Maysak intensifies into a Category 2 typhoon as it starts to develop a ragged eye.

March 30
06:00 UTC — Maysak starts to undergo rapid deepening as its eye became more clearer.
18:00 UTC — Due to more favorable environments for the storm, the JTWC upgraded Maysak to a Category 4 super typhoon, as the typhoon strengthened in size as well.

March 31
09:00 UTC — The JTWC upgrades Maysak to a Category 5 super typhoon with 1-minute sustained winds of 260 km/h (160 mph).

April
April 1
06:00 UTC — The JTWC reports that Typhoon Maysak has weakened and become equivalent to a Category 4 super typhoon on the SSHWS.
15:00 UTC — Maysak enters the PAR, with PAGASA naming it as Chedeng.
18:00 UTC — The JTWC reports that Typhoon Maysak has weakened and become equivalent to a Category 4 typhoon on the SSHWS.

April 2
12:00 UTC — The JTWC reports that Typhoon Maysak has weakened and become equivalent to a Category 3 typhoon on the SSHWS.

April 3
00:00 UTC — The JTWC reports that Typhoon Maysak has weakened and become equivalent to a Category 2 typhoon on the SSHWS.
03:00 UTC — Tropical Depression 05W develops from a cluster of clouds east of the Caroline Islands and over favorable conditions.
18:00 UTC — The JTWC reports that Typhoon Maysak has weakened and become equivalent to a Category 1 typhoon on the SSHWS.

April 4
03:00 UTC — According to the JTWC, 05W had intensified into a tropical storm.
03:00 UTC — In the same time, the JMA started issuing advisories on 05W.
06:00 UTC — The JMA reports that Typhoon Maysak has weakened into a severe tropical storm.
07:00 UTC — The JMA had stated that 05W had intensified into Tropical Storm Haishen.
12:00 UTC — The JTWC reports that Typhoon Maysak has weakened to a tropical storm.
18:00 UTC — The JMA reports that Severe Tropical Storm Maysak has weakened into a tropical storm.

April 5
06:00 UTC — The JMA downgrades Maysak to a tropical depression, whilst the JTWC still classifies it as a weak tropical storm.
18:00 UTC — The JTWC issues its final advisory on Typhoon Maysak as it has weakened into a tropical depression.

April 6
12:00 UTC — The JMA stops warning on Haishen, as it was downgraded to a low-pressure area.

April 7
21:00 UTC — The JMA stops tracking on Tropical Depression Maysak as it was last located over the South China Sea.

May
May 2
06:00 UTC — The JMA starts to monitor a tropical depression that was located to the east of Palau.

May 3
00:00 UTC — The JTWC starts issuing advisories on the depression as they upgraded it to Tropical Depression 06W.
18:00 UTC — Tropical Depression 06W intensifies into Tropical Storm Noul.
20:00 UTC — The JTWC reports that Tropical Depression 06W has intensified to a tropical storm.

May 5
18:00 UTC — Tropical Storm Noul intensified into a severe tropical storm by the JMA.

May 6
06:00 UTC — The JMA starts to monitor a new tropical depression just north of the equator near Pohnpei.
06:00 UTC — Noul intensifies into a typhoon by the JMA.
12:00 UTC — The JTWC upgraded Noul to a Category 1 typhoon.
20:00 UTC — Noul enters the PAR, as PAGASA names it Dodong.
21:00 UTC — The JTWC starts issuing advisories on the new depression and designates it as 07W.

May 7
00:00 UTC — The JTWC reports that Typhoon Noul has intensified and become equivalent to a Category 2 typhoon on the SSHWS.
12:00 UTC — The JTWC reports that Typhoon Noul has intensified and become equivalent to a Category 3 typhoon on the SSHWS.

May 9
12:00 UTC — The JMA upgrades 07W to Tropical Storm Dolphin.
12:00 UTC — The JTWC reports that Typhoon Noul has intensified and become equivalent to a Category 4 typhoon on the SSHWS.
18:00 UTC — The JTWC reports that Typhoon Noul has intensified and become equivalent to a Category 4 super typhoon on the SSHWS.

May 10
00:00 UTC — Both the JMA and the JTWC reports that Typhoon Noul had reached its peak intensity as a Category 5 super typhoon with 10-minute sustained windspeeds of 205 km/h (125 mph), which is the strongest this year in terms of windspeeds. .
07:00 UTC — PAGASA had reported that Noul (Dodong) made landfall over Santa Ana, Cagayan of the Philippines.
12:00 UTC — The JTWC reports that Typhoon Noul has weakened and become equivalent to a Category 4 super typhoon on the SSHWS.
18:00 UTC — The JTWC reports that Typhoon Noul has weakened and become equivalent to a Category 4 typhoon on the SSHWS.

May 11
00:00 UTC — The JTWC reports that Typhoon Noul has weakened and become equivalent to a Category 3 typhoon on the SSHWS.
06:00 UTC — The JTWC reports that Typhoon Noul has weakened and become equivalent to a Category 2 typhoon on the SSHWS.
12:00 UTC — The JTWC reports that Typhoon Noul has weakened and become equivalent to a Category 1 typhoon on the SSHWS.

May 12
00:00 UTC — The JTWC reports that Typhoon Noul has weakened to a tropical storm.
03:00 UTC — The JMA reports that Typhoon Noul has weakened into a severe tropical storm.
06:00 UTC — Both the JMA and the JTWC issues their final advisory on Typhoon Noul as it has transitioned into an extratropical cyclone.

May 13
00:00 UTC — The JTWC upgrades Dolphin to a Category 1 typhoon.
06:00 UTC — The JMA upgrades Dolphin to a typhoon.
12:00 UTC — The JTWC upgraded Dolphin to a Category 2 typhoon.

May 15
18:00 UTC — The JTWC reports that Typhoon Dolphin has intensified and become equivalent to a Category 3 typhoon on the SSHWS.

May 16
00:00 UTC — The JTWC reports that Typhoon Dolphin has intensified and become equivalent to a Category 4 typhoon on the SSHWS.
06:00 UTC — The JTWC reports that Typhoon Dolphin has intensified and become equivalent to a Category 4 super typhoon on the SSHWS.
09:00 UTC — The JMA reports that Typhoon Dolphin has reached its peak intensity, with 10-minute sustained windspeeds of 185 km/h (115 mph).
18:00 UTC — The JTWC reports that Typhoon Dolphin has intensified and become equivalent to a Category 5 super typhoon on the SSHWS.

May 17
06:00 UTC — The JTWC reports that Typhoon Dolphin has weakened and become equivalent to a Category 4 super typhoon on the SSHWS.
18:00 UTC — The JTWC reports that Typhoon Dolphin has weakened and become equivalent to a Category 4 typhoon on the SSHWS.

May 18
00:00 UTC — The JTWC reports that Typhoon Dolphin has weakened and become equivalent to a Category 3 typhoon on the SSHWS.
12:00 UTC — The JTWC reports that Typhoon Dolphin has weakened and become equivalent to a Category 2 typhoon on the SSHWS.
18:00 UTC — The JTWC reports that Typhoon Dolphin has weakened and become equivalent to a Category 1 typhoon on the SSHWS.

May 19
12:00 UTC — The JTWC issues its final advisory on Typhoon Dolphin as it has weakened below typhoon intensity and transitioned into an extratropical cyclone.

May 20
00:00 UTC — The JMA reports that Typhoon Dolphin has weakened into a severe tropical storm.
18:00 UTC — The JMA reports that Severe Tropical Storm Dolphin has transitioned into an extratropical cyclone.

June
June 19

June 20
15:00 UTC — The JTWC classifies the tropical depression as Tropical Depression 08W.

June 21
00:00 UTC — The JMA reports that Tropical Depression 08W has intensified into a tropical storm and names it Kujira.
12:00 UTC — The JMA reports that Tropical Storm Kujira has peaked with 10-minute sustained wind speeds of 85 km/h (50 mph).

June 22
00:00 UTC — The JTWC reports that Kujira has intensified into a tropical storm.

June 23
00:00 UTC — The JTWC reports that Tropical Storm Kujira has weakened into a tropical depression, as it emerges into the Gulf of Tonkin after impacting Hainan island.
06:00 UTC — The JTWC reports that Tropical Depression Kujira has intensified into a tropical storm.

June 24
00:00 UTC — The JTWC reports that Tropical Storm Kujira has weakened into a tropical depression and issues its final advisory, after the weakening system made landfall to the east of Hanoi, Vietnam. 
18:00 UTC — The JMA reports that Tropical Storm Kujira has weakened into a tropical depression over land.

June 25
06:00 UTC — The JMA reports that Tropical Depression Kujira has dissipated, over land to the north of Hanoi, Vietnam.

June 30
00:00 UTC — The JMA starts to monitor another tropical depression near Kosrae.

July
July 1
00:00 UTC — The JMA starts to monitor a tropical depression just east of Visayas, Philippines.
12:00 UTC — The JMA starts to monitor weak tropical depression over the Caroline Islands and southwest of Chan-hom.

July 2
03:00 UTC — The tropical depression near Visayas was monitored by the PAGASA, which gave the local name Egay.
03:00 UTC — Egay was then upgraded to Tropical Depression 10W by the JTWC.
06:00 UTC — The other tropical depression was absorbed by the nearby and intensifying Chan-hom.

July 3
00:00 UTC — Another tropical depression develops over the Marshall Islands, according to the JMA.
03:00 UTC — Both the JMA and JTWC downgrade Chan-hom to a strong tropical storm.
06:00 UTC — Linfa intensifies into a severe tropical storm.
12:00 UTC — The JTWC designates the tropical depression, 11W.
18:00 UTC — The JMA upgrades 11W to Tropical Storm Nangka.

July 6
06:00 UTC — The JTWC upgrades Nangka to a typhoon, as a ragged eye forms.

July 7

15:00 UTC — Typhoon Chan-hom enters the PAR, with PAGASA assigning the local name Falcon.

July 8
18:00 UTC — The JTWC upgrades Linfa to a minimal typhoon.

July 9
06:00 UTC — Nangka intensifies into a super typhoon.
18:00 UTC — Chan-hom intensifies into a Category 4 typhoon.
18:00 UTC — Chan-hom exits the PAR and PAGASA issues their final warning on the typhoon.

July 10
06:00 UTC — Tropical Depression Linfa fully dissipates over land.

July 12
21:00 UTC — Tropical Storm Halola crosses the International Date Line (180°), leaving the area monitored by the Central Pacific Hurricane Center and entering the western Pacific basin.

July 13
00:00 UTC — The JMA issues its final advisory on Chan-hom as it became extratropical.
00:00 UTC — The JMA starts issuing advisories on Halola, as it had been upgraded to a severe tropical storm.

July 14
00:00 UTC — Halola intensifies into a typhoon.
00:00 UTC — The JMA starts to monitor a weak tropical depression several miles east-southeast of Taiwan.
12:00 UTC — The tropical depression however dissipates as it was getting absorbed by the outflow of Nangka.

July 15
12:00 UTC — However the tropical depression regenerates into a depression by the JMA as it several nautical miles north of Palau

July 16
06:00 UTC — Halola weakens to a severe tropical storm because of its small size.
14:00 UTC — Nangka makes landfall over on the Japanese island of Shikoku.

July 17
18:00 UTC — The JMA issues its final warning on Nangka as it was downgraded to a tropical depression.

July 20
06:00 UTC — The JMA monitors a tropical depression of the coast of southern China.
18:00 UTC — However the same depression over China was absorbed by a trough.

July 23
00:00 UTC — Another tropical depression forms east of Luzon, Philippines.
09:00 UTC — The JTWC upgrades the depression to Tropical Depression 12W.
09:00 UTC — Typhoon Halola enters the PAR, with PAGASA giving the name Goring.
18:00 UTC — The JTWC upgrades 12W to a tropical storm, however the JMA still hasn't started initiating advisories on it.

July 25
00:00 UTC — The JTWC downgrades 12W to a tropical depression.
18:00 UTC — 12W dissipates as it was absorbed by the outflow of Typhoon Halola.

July 26
12:00 UTC — Both the JMA and the JTWC issues their final advisory on Halola as it weakens to a tropical depression.

July 29
18:00 UTC — The JMA starts to issue advisories on a tropical depression over the eastern Caroline Islands.

July 30
09:00 UTC — The tropical depression was given the designation 13W by the JTWC.
12:00 UTC — 13W intensifies into Tropical Storm Soudelor.

August

August 1
06:00 UTC – The JMA starts to monitor a very weak tropical depression several kilometers southeast of Japan.

August 2
06:00 UTC – Both agencies upgrade Soudelor to a typhoon.
09:00 UTC – The JTWC starts issuing advisories on the tropical depression, designating it as 14W.

August 3
12:00 UTC – The JTWC upgrades Soudelor to super typhoon status.
18:00 UTC – Soudelor reaches Category 5 super typhoon intensity.

August 4
18:00 UTC – Soudelor weakens to a Category 4 super typhoon.

August 5

00:00 UTC – PAGASA reports that Soudelor had entered their area, receiving the name Hanna.
12:00 UTC – A tropical depression develops just east of the Mariana Islands.
18:00 UTC –  The JMA stops warning on 14W.

August 7
03:00 UTC – The JTWC starts issuing advisories on the depression, designating it as 15W.
12:00 UTC – 15W intensifies into Tropical Storm Molave.

August 8
21:00 UTC – The JTWC issues its final warning on Soudelor.

August 9
12:00 UTC – Soudelor weakens to a tropical depression with the JMA issuing its final advisory.
15:00 UTC – The JTWC classifies and downgrades Molave to a subtropical depression. Therefore, they issued their final advisory.

August 10
03:00 UTC – Because of organization with Molave, the JTWC upgraded Molave to a subtropical storm.

August 11
06:00 UTC – The JMA considers that Soudelor had transitioned into an extratropical cyclone.

August 13
18:00 UTC – The JMA starts to monitor a tropical depression southeast of Guam.
21:00 UTC – The JTWC issues its final warning on Molave.

August 14
00:00 UTC – Molave transitions into an extratropical cyclone.
03:00 UTC – The depression intensifies into Tropical Depression 16W.
06:00 UTC – The JMA starts to monitor another tropical depression east-northeast of 16W.
09:00 UTC – The JTWC starts issuing advisories on the depression, designating 17W.
18:00 UTC – Both agencies upgrade 16W and 17W to tropical storms, naming them Goni and Atsani.

August 16
12:00 UTC – The JMA upgrades Atsani to a typhoon.
18:00 UTC – The JMA upgrades Goni to a typhoon.

August 19
03:00 UTC – The JTWC classifies Atsani a super typhoon.

September

October

November

December

See also

Timeline of the 2015 Pacific hurricane season
Timeline of the 2015 Atlantic hurricane season

Notes

References

External links

τ
Pacific typhoon season meteorological timelines